Colin Paul Masica (June 13, 1931 – February 23, 2022) was an American linguist who was professor emeritus in the Department of South Asian Languages and Civilizations and the Department of Linguistics at the University of Chicago. Besides being a specialist in Indo-Aryan languages, much of his work was on the typological convergence of languages belonging to different linguistic families in the South Asian area and beyond (see below), more broadly on this phenomenon in general, and on possible explanations for it and implications of it in connection with both linguistic and cultural history.

At the University of Chicago, he taught Hindi at all levels, and occasionally other South Asian languages, along with North Indian cultural history and literature, for three decades. He published on both Indo-Aryan and Dravidian languages. His magna opera are Defining a Linguistic Area: South Asia and The Indo-Aryan Languages. The latter surveyed more than a century of linguistic research on the many Indo-Aryan languages and dialects of North India, Pakistan, Afghanistan, Nepal, and Sri Lanka. It was written as part of the University of Cambridge's surveys of the language families of the world. The former has had a profound influence on the study of India as a linguistic area.

In his seminal Defining a Linguistic Area: South Asia and other writings, Masica drew on studies and grammars of both South Asian and non-South Asian languages by various European (especially Russian), British, American, Indian and other Asian scholars, to demonstrate the typological parallels among the Indo-Aryan, Dravidian, Munda, Tibeto-Burman languages of South Asia and with the Iranian and Altaic languages (including Korean and Japanese) of Central and Northeast Asia, in comparison with types prevalent beyond this zone.

Masica was born in Wahpeton, North Dakota. He served in the United States Army. Masica went to the University of Minnesota and to University of Pennsylvania. After retiring, he lived in Boscobel, Wisconsin, where he owned a farm. He died in Fennimore, Wisconsin, on February 23, 2022, at the age of 90.

Publications
Masica, Colin: "Postverbal subjects in Telugu and other languages", pages 246–73 in 
Masica, Colin: "The definition and significance of linguistic areas", pages 205–67 in 
Masica, Colin: Alternative embedding strategy in Gujarati. In P. J. Mistry and Bharati Modi, Eds. Vidyopāsanā: Studies in honor of Harivallabh C. Bhayāni. Mumbai-Ahmedabad: Image Publications. 1999. pp. 135–56.

Masica, Colin: Definiteness marking in South Asian languages. In Krishnamurti, B., Colin P. Masica, Anjani K. Sinha. South Asian Languages: Structure, Convergence and Diglossia Delhi: Motilal Banarsidass. 1986. pp. 123–46.
Masica, Colin: Aryan and Non-Aryan elements in North Indian agriculture. In Deshpande, M. M., and P. E. Hook, Eds. Aryan and Non-Aryan in India. Ann Arbor: Karoma. 1979.  pp. 55–151.

References

External links
University of Chicago, Department of Linguistics, Faculty Emeritus

1931 births
2022 deaths
Dravidologists
Linguists of Indo-Aryan languages
People from Wahpeton, North Dakota
People from Boscobel, Wisconsin
Military personnel from North Dakota
University of Chicago faculty
University of Minnesota alumni
University of Pennsylvania alumni